Yessica Mouton Gianella (born 30 January 1988) is a Bolivian model and beauty pageant titleholder who was crowned Miss Bolivia 2011, and represented her country in the 2012 Miss Universe.

Early life
Mouton speaks English and Spanish fluently. She is studied Public Relations in Nur. Yessica has participated in competitions since childhood. Yessica Sharit Gianella Mouton became the "Goddess of Fortune" Bingo Bahiti 2010, after the contest was held among 14 candidates in the city.

Miss Bolivia 2011
Yessica Mouton, Miss Litoral 2011, was named Miss Universe Bolivia, crowned June 30 at the Siriono ball room at the Fexpo in Santa Cruz. She also won the title of Miss Photogenic. Yessica said, "I want to represent our country abroad to show the diverse beauty of Bolivia, a country we are working and creative people".

Miss Universe 2012
Mouton participated in Miss Universe 2012 pageant held in Las Vegas, Nevada.

Mouton married Gerson Guiteras in 2013; the couple had their first child in 2014.

References

External links

 Official Miss Bolivia website

1988 births
Living people
Bolivian female models
Bolivian beauty pageant winners
Miss Universe 2012 contestants